Caroline Crossley is a Canadian rugby sevens player. She won a gold medal at the 2019 Pan American Games as a member of the Canada women's national rugby sevens team. CBC Sports called Crossley a "rising star" on the Canadian rugby 7s team in 2019.

Alongside teammates Pam Buisa and Charity Williams, Crossley also represents the national women's sevens team on the Rugby Canada Black, Indigenous, and People of Colour Working Group which was established on July 17, 2020.

References

1998 births
Living people
Canada international rugby sevens players
Female rugby sevens players
Rugby sevens players at the 2019 Pan American Games
Pan American Games gold medalists for Canada
Pan American Games medalists in rugby sevens
Sportspeople from New Westminster
Medalists at the 2019 Pan American Games
Canada international women's rugby sevens players
20th-century Canadian women
21st-century Canadian women